Han River may refer to:

Han River (Guangdong) (Han-jiang, 韩江), southeast China, flows into the South China Sea
Han River (Hubei and Shaanxi) (Han-shui, 漢水 or Han-jiang, 漢江), the longest tributary of the Yangtze, China
Han River (Korea) (Han-gang, 한강, 漢江), flowing through Seoul, Korea
Han River (Taiwan) (Han-xi, 旱溪), flowing through Taichung, Taiwan
Hàn River (Vietnam) (Sông Hàn), empties into the South China Sea at Da Nang

See also
 Xihan River or Western Han River, a northern tributary of the Jialing River, China

Disambiguation pages linking here
 Hanjiang (disambiguation)
 Han (disambiguation)